Agelanthus natalitius is a species of hemiparasitic plant in the family Loranthaceae, which is native to the Cape Provinces, KwaZulu-Natal, Mozambique, the Northern Provinces, South Africa, Eswatini and Botswana.

Habitat and ecology
A. natalitius is found in mixed woodland and bushland, usually on Acacias but sometimes on Combretum.

References

External links
 JSTOR Global Plants: Agelanthus natalitius. Accessed 25 March 2018.
 The International Plant Names Index: Agelanthus natalitius. Accessed 25 March 2018.

Flora of KwaZulu-Natal
Flora of Mozambique
Flora of the Cape Provinces
Flora of Swaziland
Flora of Botswana
Flora of South Africa
natalitius